Rumatha is a genus of snout moths. It was described by Carl Heinrich in 1939.

Species
Rumatha bihinda (Dyar, 1922)
Rumatha glaucatella (Hulst, 1888)
Rumatha jacumba Neunzig, 1997
Rumatha polingella (Dyar, 1906)

References

Phycitinae
Pyralidae genera
Taxa named by Carl Heinrich